Callizonus is a genus of weevils. Species are known from Peru and the Caribbean islands.

 Names brought to synonymy
 Callizonus elegans Guer., a synonym for Praepodes elegans

References

External links 

 
 Callizonus at insectoid.info

Curculionidae genera